YGG may refer to:
 Yo Gabba Gabba!, an American-Canadian live action/puppet children's television show
 YGG (group), a trio of English grime MCs
 Ygg, a name for the Norse god Odin